"Lobster Quadrille" is the twenty-sixth episode of the third series of the 1960s cult British spy-fi television series The Avengers, starring Patrick Macnee and Honor Blackman. It was first broadcast by ABC on 21 March 1964. The episode was directed by Kim Mills and written by Richard Lucas.

Plot
Steed and Cathy investigate an illegal drug smuggling operation.

Cast
 Patrick Macnee as John Steed
 Honor Blackman as Cathy Gale
 Leslie Sands as Captain Slim 
 Burt Kwouk as Mason 
 Gary Watson as Max Bush 
 Jennie Linden as Katie Miles 
 Norman Scace as Dr. Stannage 
 Corin Redgrave as Quentin Slim 
 Valentino Musetti as Jackson

Episode notes
The episode title is a reference to "The Mock Turtle's Song", also known as the "Lobster Quadrille", a song and dance in Lewis Carroll's 1865 novel Alice's Adventures in Wonderland.

The episode is notable for a number of lasts:
 This is Honor Blackman's final appearance as Cathy Gale. Blackman's forthcoming appearance in the Bond film Goldfinger, is alluded when Cathy remarks to Steed she is going 'Pussyfooting'.
 This is the final episode in the original series run to be recorded on videotape. From series 4, and continuing into The New Avengers, The Avengers would be recorded on film.
 Lobster Quadrille would be the last time the original Avengers theme, composed by Johnny Dankworth would be used. Laurie Johnson composed a new theme tune for series 4 and onwards. Johnson would remain as primary composer for the sequel series, The New Avengers.
 The last episode to have John Bryce as producer, Richard Bates as story editor (who wrote this episode under the pseudonym 'Richard Lucas') and Kim Mills as director. John Bryce would return for series 6, but left after 3 episodes. The episodes initially produced by Bryce (Invitation to a Killing, Invasion of the Earthmen and The Great Great Britain Crime) were re-edited and produced under the Fennel/Clemens banner.

See also
 Lobster-quadrille
 Quadrille
 Quadrille paper

References

External links

Episode overview on The Avengers Forever! website

The Avengers (season 3) episodes
1964 British television episodes